Rexhepi is an Albanian surname, originally a patronymic for the given name Rexhep, an older Albanian spelling for (The current spelling is Rexheb.) The digraph xh in Albanian orthography denotes the sound , similar to how the initial j is pronounced in the English word jump.  The name has been re-spelled as Redzepi outside Albania.

People with that surname include:
 Ardian Rexhepi (born 1993), Swedish football player
 Bajram Rexhepi (1954–2017), Interior Minister of the Republic of Kosovo
 Dardan Rexhepi (born 1992), Swedish football player
 Davide Redzepi (born 1988), Swiss football player 
 Emilija Redžepi, Kosovan politician
 Haris Redžepi (born 1988), Bosnian football player
 Lum Rexhepi (born 1992), Finnish football player
 Perlat Rexhepi (1919–1942), Albanian anti-fascist student, one of the Three Heroes of Shkodër
 René Redzepi (born 1977), award-winning Danish chef
 Rexhep Rexhepi (died 1999), former player and captain of Kosovar football club KF Feronikeli after whom its Rexhep Rexhepi Stadium has been named
 Rexhep Rexhepi (born 1987), award-winning watchmaker, Kosovar émigré to Switzerland
 Šakir Redžepi (born 1987), Macedonian football player

Albanian-language surnames
Patronymic surnames